The Oregon Portage Railroad was the first railroad in the U.S. state of Oregon. The railroad was located on the south bank of the Cascades canal of the Columbia River. It ran from Tanner Creek (near where Bonneville Dam was later built) to the Cascade Locks, which were under construction in the later years of the railroad's operation. Although the Oregon Portage was the first railroad in Oregon, it was not the first along the Columbia River. Francis A. Chenoweth operated a rail line on the river's north bank in present-day Washington in 1851.

History
In 1861, John W. Brazee of the Oregon Portage Company started to build a  broad gauge railroad out of a mule-and-wagon road that had been constructed by Col. Joseph S. Ruckle and Harrison Olmstead in 1856 but had been out of service since around 1858. Brazee's conversion of the road cost $50,000 USD, and the line opened on 20 May 1861, still relying on mule power. After one more year, the portage company acquired the Oregon Pony, which became the first locomotive in the Pacific Northwest, debuting for the railroad on 10 May 1862.

The Oregon Portage Railroad was operated by the Oregon Steam Navigation Company, which sold the railroad for $155,000 around the year 1880 as part of the company's sale to the Oregon Railway and Navigation Company.

Restoration of the railroad in 1891, including a conversion to the  narrow gauge, was a result of demands from steamboat captains and delays in the construction of the Cascades Locks and Canal. Steamboat captains had voiced concerns because they needed to transport goods and passengers past the Cascades Rapids and were disappointed with the quality of the Cascades Railroad. Once the locks were completed in 1896, however, demand for the Oregon Portage Railroad decreased.

See also

 Henry Villard
 Steamboats of the Columbia River: Railway completion forces steamboats off routes

References

1858 establishments in Oregon Territory
3 ft gauge railways in the United States
Columbia River Gorge
Defunct Oregon railroads
Portages in the United States
Railway lines opened in 1858
5 ft gauge railways in the United States
Transportation in Hood River County, Oregon
Transportation in Multnomah County, Oregon
1896 disestablishments in Oregon